The Andhra Christian College or A.C. College is one of the oldest colleges in India located in Guntur Andhra Pradesh. It started in 1885. AC College is part of the education enterprise of the Protestant churches. It admits intermediate, undergraduate and graduate students and awards degrees through the Acharya Nagarjuna University, Nagarjunanagar to which it is affiliated.

Saint George is its patron saint. At the entrance of the college, there is a statue of the saint slaying the dragon.

Elected officials of the Andhra Evangelical Lutheran Church administer the college.

History
AC College was established in 1885 in Guntur City and was one of the first colleges in India to offer graduate programs. Protestant missionaries from the U.S.A established the college. The then United Lutheran Church in America (ULCA) through Rev. Fr. John Christian Frederick Heyer (known as Father Heyer) established the Andhra Evangelical Lutheran Church on 31 July 1842.

Administration
Andhra Evangelical Lutheran Church (AELC) through its Board of Education administers the college. The school consists of three entities:
 Day College
 Evening College
 College of Law

Academic profile

Intermediate
Pre-university or Intermediate courses are offered. The college is affiliated to the Board of Intermediate Education, Hyderabad, a regulatory authority for pre-university courses in Andhra Pradesh.

The following course combinations are available:
 Biology, Physics, Chemistry
 Mathematics, Physics, Chemistry
 History, Economics, Commerce
 Civics, Economics, Commerce

Graduate programmes
 Bachelor of Arts (B.A.)
 Bachelor of Science (B.Sc.)
 Bachelor of Commerce (B.Com.)

Post-graduate programmes
 Master of Arts (M.A.) English and History
 Master of Science (M.Sc.) Chemistry and Zoology

Notable alumni

Business
 Kallam Anji Reddy

Film
 Sobhan Babu
 N. T. Rama Rao
 Jaggayya
 Jaya Prakash Reddy

Literature
 Jandhyala Papayya Sastry, poet who wrote Pushpa Vilapam

Politics
 Paturi Rajagopala Naidu 
 Bhavanam Venkatarami Reddy
 Kasu Brahmananda Reddy
 N. G. Ranga
 N. T. Rama Rao
 S. V. L. Narasimham
 Jesudasu Seelam
Yadlapati Venkata Rao

Theology
 Victor Premasagar
 B. V. Subbamma

In film 
 Pilla Zamindar, a Telugu film, was filmed at the college. It was named Mangamma Memorial College in the movie.
 Chalo a Telugu film, starring Naga Shaurya and Rashmika Mandanna, was filmed in the college. It was named as KGN college in the movie.
 Brochevarevarura, a Telugu film, starring Sree Vishnu and Nivetha Thomas, shot here

References

Further reading

External links 

 

Colleges in Guntur
Lutheranism in India
Educational institutions established in 1885
1885 establishments in British India
Academic institutions formerly affiliated with the University of Madras